Mister M (Absolon Zebardyn Mercator) is a fictional character appearing in American comic books published by Marvel Comics. The character was created by David Hine and David Yardin, and debuted in District X #2. Mister M wears a black suit and hat, and has the ability to manipulate molecules.

Fictional character biography

Early life
Not much is known about the enigmatic man called Mr. M. He grew up in a small village near Ghent, Belgium. After his powers manifested, he left for the United States, and after much wandering, settled in Mutant Town. Once there, he mostly stayed to himself, only leaving his apartment at night to get drunk.

Mutant Town
After seeing a painting (by an artist who painted his premonitions) of himself as a destroyer, Mr. M made up his mind that the only way he could help Mutant Town was by destroying all of the sickness and corruption. He decided to go through with it (although Bishop and Ishmael tried to stop him) leveling the city with huge displays of energy manipulation. When he had finished, his friend and neighbor Hanna Levy asked him if he would want to take it back. He agreed that if he could he would, and then Lara the Illusionist dropped her show to reveal that the destruction had been an illusion, as Ishmael had recruited her last minute to avert the disaster and Bishop had absorbed all of the energy output.

Mr. M also did good things with his powers: He regularly fixed people's electronics, and once saved Officer Ismael Ortega's daughter by removing a bullet from her body and sealing the wound.

Mr. M had made several enemies in his lifetime, and one of the dangling plotlines of the series involved a hit put out on his life. The individual actually came very close to succeeding, shooting him three times in the head at point-blank range, however his mutant abilities saved him.

Decimation/The 198
After the events of M-Day, Mr. M was one of the few individuals unaffected. He visited his hospitalized friend Hanna, who was growing insane due to all of the bugs that had begun to attack her when she lost her mutant power, and helped to heal her mind. At her suggestion, he decides to head to the Xavier Institute on foot.

When he arrives at the encampment around the Institute, he passes through the walls surrounding the school, and the Sentinels attack him. He effortlessly brushes them off, explaining that the giant robot almost stepped on a very rare caterpillar. Cyclops suggests he "must really love caterpillars" and Mister M replies "Not really... I like butterflies". Other displays of his power in the 198 camp were: creating a small pterodactyl and evolving it into butterflies, restoring the hair of Lorelei that had been cut off by angry Purity members, and creating force fields to stop the fighting between Fever Pitch, Sack, Erg and the Sentinels. The members of the X-Men are very leery about the intentions of Mr. M and the concern over his god-like abilities.  It is suggested by an agent of O.N.E. that he is an Omega-level mutant. He then begins a relationship with the girl Lorelei and when the true purpose of the "tracking" chips is revealed he removes them from all the mutants that were implanted, he then declares he is leaving for a new sanctuary and any are welcome to follow. The face in Johnny Dee's chest declares him a threat that must be eliminated. Mr. M leads his followers to an island which they reach by walking across the water, when the X-Men show up to try and talk them into returning, Cyclops is attacked by a mind controlled Erg and when he retaliates Mr. M declares he shall protect his followers.

"Death"
Johnny Dee uses his "voodoo dolls" to make Leech take away Mr. M's powers and then uses Magma to annihilate Mr. M.  That night, as Lorelei and Leech watch over Mr. M's coffin, they fall asleep. The pair wake to an empty casket. The story cuts to Lorelei and Leech, surrounded by butterflies, telling the 198 about their experience:  "I can't tell you what we saw.  I don't have the words.  [Mr. M] never appeared to anyone else, but he did not want them to grieve for him, so he sent them a message.  'Some things do not die... THEY EVOLVE!'"

Mercator
When the nation of Krakoa was established, omega-level mutants became one of its cornerstones. Most of them joined Krakoa, but Absolon was one of a few exceptions. The Krakoans finally learned of Absolon's whereabouts during the X of Swords tournament held in Otherworld.

After seizing control of Avalon, Apocalypse had invited Absolon to seize a part of the territory and to shape it as he would. Apocalypse gave him the Siege Perilous to guard, and told Absolon to keep his new realm closed off to mutantkind until the day they needed the Siege arrived. Absolon turned the territory into Mercator, a province named after himself.

Later on, Abigail Brand considered Absolon as a potential replacement for Fabian Cortez's role in The Six, but eventually chose Arakki mutant, Korra the Burning Heart instead.

During Hellfire Gala, Magneto gathered several omega level mutants in order to terraform Mars. Magneto visited Absolon to ask him to join and help with the process, but Absolon refused to participate.

Eventually a team of mutants led by Captain Britain made it to Mercator fulfilling Apocalypse's prophesy, unfortunately they were followed by the mutant-hating King Arthur, Mercator greeted Arthur personally and informed him that he'd be tested by the land itself, which was unfortunate for him because he was a horrible person, before pushing him into quicksand.

Powers and abilities
Similar to Owen Reece, Mister M has complete control over the atomic structure of molecules. He can transmute all matter and energy on a subatomic level. Thus far, his powers have been described as virtually omnipotent.

References

External links
Mister M at Marvel.com

Comics characters introduced in 2004
Marvel Comics characters who have mental powers
Marvel Comics characters with accelerated healing
Marvel Comics characters with superhuman strength
Marvel Comics telekinetics
Marvel Comics telepaths
Fictional characters who can manipulate reality
Fictional characters who can turn intangible
Fictional characters with anti-magic or power negation abilities
Fictional characters with elemental transmutation abilities
Fictional characters with energy-manipulation abilities
Fictional characters with healing abilities
Fictional characters with immortality